Múlagöng or Ólafsfjarðargöng  is a one lane tunnel in Iceland, located in Northeastern Region along Route 82, connecting Dalvík and Ólafsfjörður. It was the fourth tunnel constructed in Iceland.

References

Road tunnels in Iceland
Tunnels completed in 1991
Buildings and structures in Northeastern Region (Iceland)
1991 establishments in Iceland